The Free Knowledge Institute (FKI) is a non-profit organisation founded in 2006 in the Netherlands. Inspired by the free software movement, the FKI fosters the free exchange of knowledge in all areas of society by promoting freedom of use, modification, copying, and distribution of knowledge pertaining to education, technology, culture, and science.

The FKI coordinates and participates in projects concerning education, access to knowledge, intellectual property, and open educational resources.

Vision
Communication networks, and especially the Internet, have become the driving force of a revolution only comparable to the one that followed the invention of the printing press. In its years of existence, the Internet has given wings to our natural tendency to share information.

However, still a dominant sector of society thinks that knowledge should be protected by several legal regimes commonly referred to with the term 'intellectual property'. This term suggests that knowledge can be exclusively owned and neglects the differences between tangible and intangible goods: while tangible goods have a scarcity problem, intangible goods can be copied and shared without limit and, when shared, tend to increase their total value.

A countermovement started in the 1980s with the rise of the Free Software movement and open standards, which have produced a tremendous wealth of free software applications and form the basis of the current internet. The principles behind Free Software have inspired the unrestricted sharing and reusing of artistic and cultural works in the free content movement (including Creative Commons) and the creation and use of free educational materials in the educational sector. In a similar way, the Open Access movement promotes the sharing and open publication of research for advancing scientific knowledge.

The Free Knowledge Institute believes that by promoting the use of Free Knowledge in the fields of Technology, Education, Culture and Science more individuals and organisations will profit from the benefits of sharing knowledge.

Founding principles
The Free Knowledge Institute has formulated a set of principles that it considers basic for being consistent with its vision. These founding principles take as a starting point the sharing of knowledge in the tradition of copyleft and include the use of free software, adherence to open standards, the importance of education, respect for diversity and different cultures, transparency and consensus.

Activities
In order to work towards this vision, the Free Knowledge Institute participates in political debates and activism to highlight the wrongs of certain policies and propose alternatives. For that reason the FKI works together in various networks and coalitions with other groups and organisations. With the Open Net Coalition, a collective warning has been formulated about policy proposals in the EU parliament threatening internet neutrality.

Projects

SELF Project
The SELF Platform aims to become a collaborative web platform with high quality educational and training materials about Free Software and Open Standards. It is based on world-class Free Software technologies that permit both reading and publishing free materials, and is driven by a worldwide community.

SELF (Science, Education and Learning in Freedom) is an international project that was initially financed by the European Commission which has developed a platform to encourage creative cooperation and the sharing of educational materials and continuous training, paying special attention to free software and open standards. Inspired by the Wikipedia model, the SELF Platform is open to the contributions of all those who would like to bring their knowledge to it, and share this knowledge without restrictions,.

Free Knowledge, Free Technology Conference
The Free Knowledge, Free Technology Conference (FKFT) was an event that centered the production and sharing of educational and training materials in the field of Free Software and Open Standards. It was held first in 2008 in Barcelona and was organised by the SELF Project and the Free Knowledge Institute.

Free Technology Academy
The Free Technology Academy consists of an advanced virtual campus with course modules that can be followed entirely on-line. The learning materials are Open Educational Resources that can be studied freely, but learners enrolled in the FTA will be guided by professional teaching staff from the participating universities. The full master programme can be concluded at one of the universities.
The project financially supported by the Life Long Learning Programme (LLP) of the European Commission, is a collaboration between the FKI and various European universities and organisations like the 
Open Universiteit Nederland (OUNL) from The Netherlands, the Open University of Catalonia (UOC) from Spain and others.,.

Free Culture Forum
The Free Culture Forum was an international encounter on free culture and knowledge that took place in Barcelona from 30 October to 1 November 2009. It took place jointly with the second edition of the oXcars. During the Forum 200 organizations and individuals linked to free culture expressions discuss on the privatization of the creation and the intellectual property and its incidence in the access to the knowledge and the creation and distribution of the art, knowledge and culture. The Forum ended up with the definition of a "Charter for Innovation, Creativity and Access to Knowledge".

The first edition of the Forum was organised by Exgae, Networked politics and the Free Knowledge Institute.

References

External links
Official Website
Technology News

Organisations based in Amsterdam
Computer law organizations
Foundations based in the Netherlands
Privacy organizations
Internet-related activism
Intellectual property activism
Knowledge sharing
2006 establishments in the Netherlands
Access to Knowledge movement
Organizations established in 2006